Higher Buxton railway station was opened in 1894 to the south east of Buxton, Derbyshire, on the LNWR line to Ashbourne and the south.

It utilised part of the Cromford and High Peak Railway (which ran from Whaley Bridge to Cromford), joining it at Hindlow and proceeding to a branch to Ashbourne at Parsley Hay

The station was located next to Clifton Road, and between it and Dale Road was an extensive goods yard which had been opened in 1891 as part of the scheme to link Buxton with High Peak Junction near Cromford. Like all the stations on the line the platforms and buildings were of timber construction.

The station was never very busy, being close to the main station, and it closed in 1951.

Passenger services on the line finished in 1954 but the now-single line remains open for mineral trains serving the lime works at Dowlow.

Route

See also
 Cromford and High Peak Railway
 Ashbourne Line

References

Bibliography
 Bentley, J.M., Fox, G.K., (1997) Railways of the High Peak: Buxton to Ashbourne (Scenes From The Past series 32), Romiley: Foxline Publishing

Disused railway stations in Derbyshire
Buildings and structures in Buxton
Railway stations in Great Britain opened in 1894
Railway stations in Great Britain closed in 1951
Former London and North Western Railway stations